Pearl tea may refer to:

 Bubble tea, tea, milk, and chewy tapioca balls
 Gunpowder tea (zhū chá or "pearl tea"), a form of green Chinese tea